Vuko Borozan (born 9 April 1994) is a Montenegrin handball player who plays for RK Zagreb.

Achievements

Vardar
 EHF Champions League
 Winner: 2016–17, 2018–19

 SEHA League
 Winner: 2016–17, 2017–18, 2018–19

 Macedonian Handball Super League
 Winner: 2016–17, 2017-18, 2018-19

 Macedonian Handball Cup
 Winner: , 2017, 2018 

 Macedonian Handball Super Cup
 Winner: 2017, 2018, 2019

Individual
 Montenegrin Sportsperson of the Year

References

1994 births
Living people
Montenegrin male handball players
Sportspeople from Cetinje
Expatriate handball players
Montenegrin expatriate sportspeople in Germany
Montenegrin expatriate sportspeople in North Macedonia
Handball-Bundesliga players